Haggerston is a ward in the London Borough of Hackney and forms part of the Hackney South and Shoreditch constituency. It roughly aligns with the core area of the neighborhood of Haggerston.

Elections 2014
The ward returns three councillors to Borough Council. At the 22 May 2014 local elections Ann Munn, Jonathan McShane, and Barry Buitekant, all Labour Party candidates, were returned. Turnout was 34.91%.

Elections 2018
At the 3 May 2018 local elections Ajay Chauhan, Patrick Spence, and Humaira Garasia, all Labour Party candidates, were returned. Turnout was 33.0%.

References

External links
 Haggerston ward profile
 Labour Party profile of the three Haggerston councillors

Wards of the London Borough of Hackney
1965 establishments in England